Warship Under Sail: The USS Decatur in the Pacific West is a historical nonfiction work by Seattle author Lorraine McConaghy.  Based on archives of the United States Navy, it documents 's 1854–1859 Pacific Ocean cruises.  During this time Decatur played a part in the 1856 Battle of Seattle and William Walker's Nicaraguan filibuster.

References

Bibliography

History of the Pacific Northwest
History books about the United States
2009 non-fiction books
Non-fiction books about the United States Navy